Beilstein may refer to:

Places in Germany
Beilstein, Hesse, a village
Beilstein, Rhineland-Palatinate, a municipality
Beilstein, Württemberg, a town
Beilstein (Rhön), an extinct volcano in Hesse
Beilstein (Spessart), a hill in the Main-Kinzig district of Hesse

Other uses
Beilstein, a peak in the Hochschwab Mountains, Austria
Friedrich Konrad Beilstein (1838–1906), Russian chemist
Beilstein database, in organic chemistry
Beilstein Institute for the Advancement of Chemical Sciences
Beilstein Journal of Nanotechnology
Beilstein Journal of Organic Chemistry
Beilstein Registry Number
Beilstein test, a qualitative test for halides

See also

Counts of Nassau-Beilstein, in the House of Nassau
Lordship of Winneburg and Beilstein, a territory of the Holy Roman Empire